The energy content of biofuel is the chemical energy contained in a given biofuel, measured per unit mass of that fuel, as specific energy, or per unit of volume of the fuel, as energy density.
A biofuel is a fuel produced from recently living organisms. Biofuels include bioethanol, an alcohol made by fermentation—often used as a gasoline additive, and biodiesel, which is usually used as a diesel additive. Specific energy is energy per unit mass, which is used to describe the chemical energy content of a fuel, expressed in SI units as joule per kilogram (J/kg) or equivalent units. Energy density is the amount of chemical energy per unit volume of the fuel, expressed in SI units as joule per litre (J/L) or equivalent units.

Energy and CO2 output of common biofuels 

The table below includes entries for popular substances already used for their energy, or being discussed for such use.

The second column shows specific energy, the energy content in megajoules per unit of mass in kilograms, useful in understanding the energy that can be extracted from the fuel.

The third column in the table lists energy density, the energy content per liter of volume, which is useful for understanding the space needed for storing the fuel.

The final two columns deal with the carbon footprint of the fuel. The fourth column contains the proportion of CO2 released when the fuel is converted for energy, with respect to its starting mass, and the fifth column lists the energy produced per kilogram of CO2 produced. As a guideline, a higher number in this column is better for the environment. But these numbers do not account for other green house gases released during burning, production, storage, or shipping. For example, methane may have hidden environmental costs that are not reflected in the table.

Notes

Yields of common crops associated with biofuels production

Notes

See also 
 Eichhornia crassipes#Bioenergy
 Syngas
 Conversion of units
 Energy density
 Heat of combustion

References 

Biofuels technology